Pomology (from Latin , “fruit,” + ) is a branch of botany that studies fruit and its cultivation. The term fruticulture—introduced from Romance languages (all of whose incarnations of the term descend from Latin  and )—is also used.

Pomological research is mainly focused on the development, enhancement, cultivation and physiological studies of fruit trees. The goals of fruit tree improvement include enhancement of fruit quality, regulation of production periods, and reduction of production cost. One involved in the science of pomology is called a pomologist.

History

Middle East 
In ancient Mesopotamia, pomology was practiced by the Sumerians, who are known to have grown various types of fruit, including dates, grapes, apples, melons, and figs. While the first fruits cultivated by the Egyptians were likely indigenous, such as the palm date and sorghum, more fruits were introduced as other cultural influences were introduced. Grapes and watermelon were found throughout predynastic Egyptian sites, as were the sycamore fig, dom palm and Christ's thorn. The carob, olive, apple and pomegranate were introduced to Egyptians during the New Kingdom. Later, during the Greco-Roman period peaches and pears were also introduced.

Europe 

The ancient Greeks and Romans also had a strong tradition of pomology, and they cultivated a wide range of fruits, including apples, pears, figs, grapes, quinces, citron, strawberries, blackberries, elderberries, currants, damson plums, dates, melons, rose hips and pomegranates. Less common fruits were the more exotic azeroles and medlars. Cherries and apricots, both introduced in the 1st century BC, were popular. Peaches were introduced in the 1st century AD from Persia. Oranges and lemons were known but used more for medicinal purposes than in cookery.. The Romans, in particular, were known for their advanced methods of fruit cultivation and storage, and they developed many of the techniques that are still used in modern pomology.

United States
During the mid-19th century in the United States, farmers were expanding fruit orchard programs in response to growing markets. At the same time, horticulturists from the USDA and agricultural colleges were bringing new varieties to the US from foreign expeditions, and developing experimental lots for these fruits. In response to this increased interest and activity, the USDA established the Division of Pomology in 1886 and named Henry E. Van Deman as chief pomologist. An important focus of the division was to publish illustrated accounts of new varieties and to disseminate research findings to fruit growers and breeders through special publications and annual reports. During this period Andrew Jackson Downing and his brother Charles were prominent in pomology and horticulture, producing The Fruits and Fruit Trees of America (1845).

The introduction of new varieties required an exact depiction of the fruit so that plant breeders could accurately document and disseminate their research results. Since the use of scientific photography was not widespread in the late 19th century, the USDA commissioned artists to create watercolor illustrations of newly introduced cultivars. Many of the watercolors were used for lithographic reproductions in USDA publications, such as the Report of the Pomologist and the Yearbook of Agriculture. Today, the collection of approximately 7,700 watercolors is preserved in the National Agricultural Library's Special Collections, where it serves as a major historic and botanic resource to a variety of researchers, including horticulturists, historians, artists, and publishers.

See also 
 Arboriculture
 Floriculture
 Horticulture
 Olericulture
 Trophort
 Viticulture

References

External links
American Pomological Society — oldest fruit organization in North America
German Pomological Society — German fruit organization

 
 
Branches of botany
Agronomy
Horticulture